The 1944 United States Senate election in Maryland was held on November 7, 1944. Incumbent Democratic U.S. Senator Millard Tydings was re-elected to a fourth term in office over Republican Blanchard Randall Jr.

Democratic primary

Candidates
Charles Baden
Willis R. Jones
Vincent F. Long
Stephen Peddicord, candidate for Governor in 1942
Millard Tydings, incumbent Senator since 1927

Results

Republican primary

Candidates
Rives Matthews
Blanchard Randall Jr., philanthropist
Paul Robertson

Results

General election

Results

See also 
 1944 United States Senate elections

References 

Maryland
1944
United States Senate